Michael George Mitchell (born October 18, 1961) is a former American football cornerback in the National Football League for the Washington Redskins and the New York Jets.  He played college football at Howard Payne University.

1961 births
Living people
sportspeople from Waco, Texas
American football cornerbacks
Washington Redskins players
New York Jets players